Frank Schaettle (June 16, 1864 – May 14, 1926) was a member of the Wisconsin State Assembly.

Biography
Schaettle was born on June 16, 1864 in Buffalo City, Wisconsin. In January 1898, he married Evangeline Blair. His brother, George, was a village supervisor and county board member. He was arrested for violation of the White-Slave Traffic Act in 1918. Schaettle died on May 14, 1926 and his estate, valued at $282,000, was settled following a state supreme court decision in 1930.

Career
Schaettle was elected to the Assembly in 1916. In addition, he was mayor of Alma, Wisconsin and of Mondovi, Wisconsin, as well as a member of the  Board of Education (school board) of Mondovi. He was a Republican.

References

External links

Wisconsin Historical Society

People from Buffalo County, Wisconsin
Republican Party members of the Wisconsin State Assembly
County supervisors in Wisconsin
Wisconsin city council members
Mayors of places in Wisconsin
School board members in Wisconsin
1864 births
1926 deaths
Burials in Wisconsin
People from Alma, Wisconsin